Ward B. "Hoot" Gibson Jr. (December 5, 1921 – February 1, 1958) was an American professional basketball player. He played for several teams in the National Basketball League (NBL) and National Basketball Association (NBA).

Gibson was killed in a car accident in his hometown of Des Moines, Iowa when he lost control of the vehicle he was driving and hit a tree. He was survived by his wife, Vonnie.

NBA career statistics

Regular season

References

External links

1921 births
1958 deaths
American men's basketball players
Basketball players from Des Moines, Iowa
Boston Celtics players
Centers (basketball)
Creighton Bluejays men's basketball players
Denver Nuggets (1948–1950) players
Power forwards (basketball)
Road incident deaths in Iowa
Tri-Cities Blackhawks players
Undrafted National Basketball Association players
Waterloo Hawks players